Dennis van Aarssen (born 2 June 1994) is a Dutch singer who won the 9th season of the Voice of Holland.

Life and career 
Dennis van Aarssen was born in The Netherlands. He developed a passion for swing and jazz and cited Robbie Williams’ album Swing When You’re Winning, which he first heard as a seven-year-old, as his early inspiration. Prior to entering The Voice of Holland, van Aarssen had a YouTube channel where he showcased his renditions of songs by songs by Frank Sinatra, Sammy Davis Jr. and Michael Bublé, among others.

With a debut album that resulted in a gold record, a theater tour with 31 shows and 20,000 tickets sold and an Edison Award, 'crooner' Dennis van Aarssen had the proverbial wind at his back. The future smiled on Dennis. Until in March 2020, as a result of the Corona pandemic and subsequent measures, the world suddenly looked very different. All plans had to be adjusted or cancelled. The planned trip to New York in early 2020 was cancelled, the release of a deluxe version of the debut album was postponed, performances at festivals were cancelled, the planned autumn tour 'That's Life' as a reprise of the successful first theater tour was always postponed. The momentum seemed gone.

However, sitting still was not an option. So Dennis decided, among other things, to provide streaming performances from the studio. For sixteen weeks, once a week a short show of about 30 minutes. Jazzy swing, always with tracks from his favorite singers like Frank Sinatra. He also gave two shows in a smaller setting in Afas Live.

When it becomes clear that the second theater tour will be postponed again to the fall of 2021 due to the measures, Dennis throws himself into writing new songs. Several writing sessions took place, including with René van Mierlo, guitarist with Diggy Dex and Stef Bos, and producer Marcel Tegelaar, known for his work with Guus Meeuwis and Diggy Dex, among others. “In the summer of 2020 I had already taken a trip with the track ' Meet Me In Miami', produced by Marcel. I immediately clicked with Rene and Marcel and we started working on new material in April of this year. That new work was less suited to the big band genre, but I thought it was great. The final result is a summery EP with five electro swing tracks.”

But the focus soon shifts to the new, second studio album. Dennis worked on new songs in early 2020 with Jeff Franzel, former pianist and songwriter of Frank Sinatra, and Maria Christensen, lyricist who wrote for Celine Dion and Jennifer Lopez, among others. Dennis had already worked with this duo for his debut album. Eight new songs emerged from that session, four of which appear on the new album. In addition to two covers (Death of a Bachelor by Panic at the Disco and Lonely Boy by The Black Keys), the album has ten new songs. In collaboration with other writers, digital tools such as Zoom or Teams offered a solution. Dennis: “But it's not easy to work on new songs together via Zoom. Where I write eight new songs in four days with Jeff in the studio,

Discography

Singles 
 "Meet Me In Miami"
 "Christmas Afterparty"

Albums

Forever You (2019) 
Songs Included:

 "That's Life"
 "Doing Alright"
 "Superhero"
 "Forever You"
 "High Hopes"
 "Strawberry Moon"
 "Let's Fall"
 "My Favorite Place in the World"
 "Lido Shuffle"

How to Live (2021) 
The album How To Live was recorded together with the DVA Bigband in the E-Sounds Studio in Weesp and produced by Paul Willemsen. The album will be released in November 2021, just after the start of the 'Swinging On A Star' theater tour that started in October. “I think 'How To Live' is a really fitting title for this album. There is also a personal story to it. I already knew I wanted to be an artist. I was always the clown, always wanted attention and to be on stage. My brother saw me following my passion and having a very clear goal and those are two things he was missing. I then fought a tough battle with him. Because I thought he just did some. No direction chose. I thought I would help him by telling him what to do and what not to do. My parents have to show me that it doesn't work that way. You cannot tell other people what and how to organize their lives. And that's what this song is about. My brother and I are now best friends.”

Songs included:

 "I can't make this right"
 "Spider Man"
 "I Still Got It"
 "After All This Time"
 "Should Be Over You"
 "Death Of A Bachelor"
 "Don't Stop"
 "Lonely Boy"
 "How to Live"
 "Raise A Glass"
 "Can't Leave Her Alone"
 "Valentine's Day"

Christmas When You're Here (2022) 
Songs included:

 "Kris P. (The Christmas Elf)"
 "Every Time When Christmas Comes Around "
 "(Will You Be) Gone by Christmas Night"
 "Hang Your Lights"
 "The Old Songs"
 "Stay For Christmas"
 "Driving Home For Christmas"
 "Santa's Crazy North Pole Orchestra"
 "That's Joy In Your Heart"
 "Christmas When You're Here"

References

External links

Dennis van Aarssen on Youtube
Dennis van Aarssen on Spotify
Dennis van Aarsen Official Website

Living people
The Voice (franchise) winners
21st-century Dutch male singers
21st-century Dutch singers
1994 births